Emmett Marshall Owen (October 19, 1877 – June 21, 1939) was an American politician, educator, farmer and lawyer.

Early life and education
Owen was born near Hollonville, Georgia, in Pike County. He graduated from the Gordon Institute in 1898 and from the University of Georgia School of Law in Athens in 1900. While at UGA, he was a member of the Phi Kappa Literary Society.  Owen taught school in Butts County, Georgia from 1901 to 1902. He was admitted to the Georgia state bar in 1902 and became a practicing lawyer in Zebulon, Georgia. He also was a peach farmer.

Public office
In 1902, Owen was elected to the Georgia House of Representatives and served in that body through 1906. He was also the Mayor of Zebulon from 1905 through 1907. From 1906 through 1909, Owen was the Pike County court solicitor after which he became solicitor of the Zebulon city court from 1909 to 1912. He continued in that same role for the Flint judicial circuit from 1913 through 1923 and for the Griffin judicial circuit from 1923 through 1933.

Owen won election to the United States House of Representatives in 1932 as a Democrat representing Georgia's 4th congressional district in the 73rd United States Congress. He was reelected for three additional terms.

Death
Emmett Marshall Owen died on June 21, 1939, in Washington, D.C., from a heart attack, while serving his fourth term in the U.S. House of Representatives. On April 24, 1940, Rep. Marvin Jones of Texas and Rep. Milton A. Romjue of Missouri delivered  memorial speeches before the House recounting the life and career of Representative Owen. As was the practice at the time, Owen's two children received a death benefit appropriation from the United States government of $5,000 each ($10,000 total). Owen was buried in East View Cemetery in Zebulon.

See also
 List of United States Congress members who died in office (1900–49)

References

External links

 

1877 births
1939 deaths
People from Pike County, Georgia
University of Georgia alumni
Georgia (U.S. state) lawyers
Democratic Party members of the Georgia House of Representatives
Democratic Party members of the United States House of Representatives from Georgia (U.S. state)
Mayors of places in Georgia (U.S. state)
People from Zebulon, Georgia